Green Wave may refer to:

Green wave, a series of traffic lights coordinated to allow continuous traffic flow in one main direction
The Green Wave, a 2010 documentary film directed by Iranian-German Ali Samadi Ahadi
Green Wave (radio show), a Vietnamese music chart programme
The Green Wave, an 1866 painting by Claude Monet
Green Wave (abortion rights), a group of abortion-rights activists in the Americas
"Green Wave", a cultivar of the polypodium fern
Green Wave, a preservationist group, organized by Russian singer and actor Mikhail Novitsky
Greenwave, a mass science experiment involving primary schools across Ireland
GreenWave, an aquaculture non-profit in North America

Sports teams

College teams
 Tulane Green Wave, the athletic teams of Tulane University, New Orleans, Louisiana, United States

United States high schools teams
Abington High School, Abington, Massachusetts
Ashbrook High School (North Carolina), Gastonia, North Carolina
Audubon High School, Audubon, New Jersey
Cathedral High School (Natchez, Mississippi)
Churchill County High School, Fallon, Nevada
Clintwood High School, Clintwood, Virginia
Dover High School (New Hampshire), Dover, New Hampshire
Easley High School, Easley, South Carolina
East Grand Forks Senior High School, East Grand Forks, Minnesota
Father Lopez Catholic High School, Daytona Beach, Florida
Fort Myers High School, Fort Myers, Florida
Gallatin High School (Tennessee), Gallatin, Tennessee
Greenville High School (Ohio), Greenville, Ohio
Greenfield High School (Massachusetts), Greenfield, Massachusetts
Holy Name High School, Parma Heights, Ohio
Hudson Catholic High School (Hudson, Massachusetts)
Leeds High School, Leeds, Alabama
Long Branch High School, Long Branch, New Jersey
Malden High School, Malden, Missouri
Mattoon High School, Mattoon, Illinois
Meade County High School, Brandenburg, Kentucky

Mount Saint Joseph Academy (Rutland, Vermont)
Narrows High School, Narrows, Virginia
Newark Catholic High School, Newark, Ohio
New Milford High School (Connecticut), New Milford, Connecticut

Ponchatoula High School, Ponchatoula, Louisiana

Spencer High School (Columbus, Georgia)
St. Edward Central Catholic High School (Elgin, Illinois)
Summerville High School, Summerville, South Carolina
Delbarton School, Morristown, New Jersey
West Point High School (Mississippi), West Point, Mississippi